State Route 776 (SR 776) is an east–west state highway located in southern Ohio. Its eastern terminus is at another T-intersection with SR 139 in Jackson.

This route was formed in the late 1930s. From its western terminus in Scioto County, SR 776 heads east in the former Teays River valley. It heads due north into Pike County briefly and then back due east into Jackson County, where it passes through forest patches.

Route description
This state highway passes through portions of Scioto, Pike and Jackson Counties.  No part of SR 776 is included within the National Highway System.

History
SR 776 was designated in 1938 along the routing that it currently occupies between SR 335 and SR 139.  There have been no changes of major significance that have taken place to this route since it was established.

Major intersections

References

776
Transportation in Scioto County, Ohio
Transportation in Jackson County, Ohio
Transportation in Pike County, Ohio